Olivier Thévenin (born 25 February 1968 in Orléans) is a retired French racing driver.

References

1968 births
Living people
French racing drivers
24 Hours of Le Mans drivers
Sportspeople from Orléans
20th-century French people